Diane Bell may refer to:

 Diane Bell (anthropologist) (born 1943), Australian anthropologist
 Diane Bell (director) (21st century), Scottish film director
 Diane Bell (judoka) (born 1963), British judoka